The Baltic Indoor Athletics Championships was an annual indoor track and field competition between athletes from the Baltic states (Estonia, Latvia, Lithuania). The competition featured 26 individual events, divided evenly between the sexes, and had team titles for each sex and an overall combined team title.

Hosting duties for the competition passed between Estonia and Lithuania, with Tallinn holding the event seven times, Kaunas three times, and Panevėžys twice. The competition was held each February from 1995 to 2006. It was a two-day competition until 2001, after which it was contested over a single day. The final competition in 2006 was between Latvia and Lithuania only.

The competition's lifetime overlapped with the Baltic Sea Games, a multi-sport event which was hosted in Tallinn in 1993 and Kaunas in 1997.

Editions

Events

Men

Women's

See also
Finland-Sweden Athletics International

References

Sport in the Baltic states
Recurring sporting events established in 1995
1995 establishments in Lithuania
Annual sporting events
February sporting events
International athletics competitions hosted by Estonia

International athletics competitions hosted by Lithuania
Recurring sporting events disestablished in 2006
Spring (season) events (Northern Hemisphere)
Defunct athletics competitions